Tony Morgan (born 13 June 1969) is a British weightlifter. He competed in the men's middleweight event at the 1992 Summer Olympics.

References

External links
 

1969 births
Living people
British male weightlifters
Olympic weightlifters of Great Britain
Weightlifters at the 1992 Summer Olympics
Sportspeople from Cambridge
Commonwealth Games medallists in weightlifting
Commonwealth Games bronze medallists for Wales
Weightlifters at the 1998 Commonwealth Games
20th-century British people
Medallists at the 1998 Commonwealth Games